Shiritsu Horitsuba Gakuen ( lit. "Horitsuba Private Academy") or Horitsuba for short, is a short comedy series by the manga artist circle CLAMP that serialized from 2006 to 2011 in Weekly Shōnen Magazine. It is made up of manga chapters and audio dramas. The title comes from mashing together the titles for xXxHOLiC and Tsubasa: Reservoir Chronicle. The story features characters from both series as well as numerous other established CLAMP characters. The Horitsuba Gakuen saga offers an independent story.. Shiritsu Horitsuba Gakuen takes place in a private campus like the "CLAMP Campus" where there are study centers for all ages (from preschool through college) as well as leisure and business services.

Characters 
 Fai–Shiritsu Horitsuba Gakuen's Chemistry teacher and twin Yuui's twin brother.
 Himawari Kunogi–A high school student at Shiritsu Horitsuba Gakuen and friends with Kimihiro Watanuki and Shizuka Doumeki.
 Kimihiro Watanuki–A high school student at Shiritsu Horitsuba Gakuen and co-host of a radio show with Sakura-san.
 Kurogane–Shiritsu Horitsuba Gakuen's Physical Education teacher.
 Sakura-san–A high school student at Shiritsu Horitsuba Gakuen and Sakura-chan's cousin.  Sakura-san hosts a radio show along with Kimihiro Watanuki.
 Sakura-chan–An elementary school student at Shiritsu Horitsuba Gakuen and Sakura-san's cousin.
 Shizuka Doumeki–A high school student at Shiritsu Horitsuba Gakuen and friends with Kimihiro Watanuki and Himawari Kunogi.
 Syaoron (Older Twin)–A high school student at Shiritsu Horitsuba Gakuen and Syaoran's older twin.
 Syaoran (Younger Twin)–A high school student at Shiritsu Horitsuba Gakuen and Syaoron's younger twin.  It is revealed during  "The Exciting Christmas Cake" that he has a crush on Sakura-san.
 Yuui–Shiritsu Horitsuba Gakuen's Home Economics teacher and Fai's twin brother.  He also assists with the radio show although it is unclear what exactly he does.
 Yuuko Ichihara–Director and Literature teacher at Shiritsu Horitsuba Gakuen.

References

2006 manga
Shōnen manga
Kodansha manga
Works by Clamp (manga artists)
Japanese radio dramas